The Westfield Starfires are a collegiate summer baseball team based in Westfield, Massachusetts. They play in the Futures Collegiate Baseball League (FCBL), a wood-bat league with a 56-game regular season comprising eight teams from northern Vermont to western Connecticut. The team, owned by Chris Thompson, plays its home games at Bullens Field in Westfield.

Founding
The Starfires entered the FCBL in 2019, replacing the Martha's Vineyard Sharks, who switched to the New England Collegiate Baseball League. The Starfires name was revealed at a media event in Westfield on February 20, 2019. On March 12, 2019, the club announced that its first field manager would be Bill Sandillo, a native of West Springfield and a former player and captain at American International College.

In 2020, the Futures Collegiate League was one of only two leagues nationally to play baseball during the COVID-19 pandemic; leaving Westfield and its fellow teams as prime destinations for some of College Baseball's best talents. The 2020 team featured future professionals such as Nick Dombkowski of the Pittsburgh Pirates organization and highly rated prospect Reggie Crawford. In spite of its star-power, the Starfires finished one game outside the FCBL playoffs in 2020.

References

Futures Collegiate Baseball League teams
Amateur baseball teams in Massachusetts
2019 establishments in Massachusetts
Baseball teams established in 2019